The 2017 Mid-Season Invitational was the third annual Mid-Season Invitational (MSI) - a tournament for the MOBA video game League of Legends was hosted by Riot Games. The tournament was held from April 28 to May 21, 2017, in Brazil. This was the first time MSI had been extended. Each of 13 premier League of Legends leagues had a team that won the Spring Split represent them; Europe (EU LCS), South Korea (LCK), and China (LPL) had their teams automatically admitted into the main event whereas the other 10 leagues competed among each other in a "Play-in Stage" with the top 3 teams advancing to join the main event.

SK Telecom T1 from South Korea defended successfully their championship in last year after defeating G2 Esports from Europe 3–1 at the final.

Qualified teams and roster

Qualified team 
Based on the result of the MSI and World Championship in 2 years before (2015–2016), 3 teams from Europe (EU LCS), South Korea (LCK), and China (LPL) are started in Main Group stage, 2 teams from North America (NA LCS) and Taiwan/Hong Kong/Macau (LMS) are started in Play-in round 2, and instead of the Mid-Season International Wildcard Invitational in 2015–2016, 8 teams from Wildcard regions are started in Play-in round 1.

Roster

Venues 
São Paulo and Rio de Janeiro were the two cities chosen to host the competition.

Play-In Stage

Round 1 
First place teams of each group advance to round 2 of the stage

Draw

Only 2 teams of each pool is drawn into a group.

Group A

Group B

Round 2 
Winners of the series advance to group stage. Losers drops to round 3.

Round 3 
GIGABYTE Marines advance to group stage by beating SuperMassive eSports 3–1. GPL of Southeast Asia gets directly spot in Main Group Stage for Summer Split winner and additional spot in Play-in Stage for Summer Split Runner-up at 2017 World Championship.

Group stage

Notes

Knockout stage 

 The 1st-place team plays with the 4th-place team, The 2nd-place team plays with the 3rd-place team in semifinals.
 All matches are Best-of-five.

Ranking

References

2010s in Rio de Janeiro
2017 in esports
2017 multiplayer online battle arena tournaments
2017